This is a list of Plan 9 programs. Many of these programs are very similar to the UNIX programs with the same name, others are to be found only on Plan 9. Others again share only the name, but have a different behaviour.

System software

General user 
 dd – convert and copy a file
 date – date and time
 echo – print arguments
 file – determine file type
 ns – display namespace
 plumb – send message to plumber
 plumber – interprocess messaging
 rc – rc is the Plan 9 shell
 rio – the new Plan 9 windowing system
 8½ – the old Plan 9 windowing system 
 uptime – show how long the system has been running

System management

Processes and tasks management 
 time – time a command
 kill, slay, broke – print commands to kill processes
 sleep – suspend execution for an interval
 ps – process status
 psu – process status information about processes started by a specific user

User management and support 
 passwd, netkey, iam – change user password
 who – who is using the machine
 man, lookman – print or find pages of this manual

File system and server 
 /boot/boot – connect to the root file server
 fossil/fossil, fossil/flchk, fossil/flfmt, fossil/conf, fossil/last – archival file server
 history – print file names from the dump
 users – file server user list format
 vac – create a vac archive on Venti
 venti/buildindex, venti/checkarenas, venti/checkindex, venti/conf, venti/copy, venti/fmtarenas, venti/fmtindex, venti/fmtisect, venti/rdarena, venti/rdarenablocks, venti/read, venti/wrarenablocks, venti/write – Venti maintenance and debugging commands
 venti/venti, venti/sync – an archival block storage server
 yesterday, diffy – print file names from the dump

Hardware devices 
 setrtc – set real time clock (RTC) on PC hardware

Files and text

Filesystem utilities 
 chgrp – change file group
 chmod – change mode
 cp, fcp, mv – copy, move files
 du – disk usage
 ls, lc – list contents of directory
 mkdir – make a directory
 bind, mount, umount – change name space
 pwd, pbd – working directory
 rm – remove files
 touch – set modification date of a file

Archivers and compression 
 ar – archive and library maintainer
 gzip, gunzip, bzip2, bunzip2, compress, uncompress, zip, unzip – compress and expand data
 tar – archiver

Text processing 
 awk – pattern-directed scanning and processing language
 cat, read – catenate files
 cmp – compare two files
 diff – differential file comparator
 doc2txt, xls2txt – extract printable strings from Microsoft Office documents
 doctype – intuit command line for formatting a document
 fmt, htmlfmt – simple text formatters
 freq – print histogram of character frequencies
 grep – search a file for a pattern
 idiff – interactive diff
 mc – multicolumn print
 p – paginate
 pr – print file
 sed – stream editor
 spell, sprog – find spelling errors
 split – split a file into pieces
 tail – deliver the last part of a file
 tcs – translate character sets
 tr – translate characters
 wc – word count
 xd – hex, octal, decimal or ASCII dump of file

Editors 
 acme – interactive text editor and shell
 ed – text editor
 sam – screen editor with structural regular expressions

Communication, networking and remote access 
 con, telnet, rx, xms, xmr – remote login, execution, and XMODEM file transfer
 cpu – connection to CPU server
 dial/at, dial/drain, dial/expect, dial/pass – dialer scripting tools
 netstat – summarize network connections
 replica/changes, replica/pull, replica/push, replica/scan – client–server replica management
 ssh, sshnet, scp, aux/sshserve – secure login and file copy from/to Unix or Plan 9
 tel, iwhois – look in phone book
 vncs, vncv – remote frame buffer server and viewer for Virtual Network Computing (VNC)

Email and news programs 
 faces, seemail, vwhois – mailbox interface
 mail – mail and mailboxes
 news – print news items
 upas/filter, upas/list, upas/deliver, upas/token, upas/vf – filtering mail
 upas/fs – mail file server
 upas/marshal – formatting and sending mail
 upas/ml, upas/mlmgr, upas/mlowner – unmoderated mailing lists
 upas/nedmail – reading mail
 upas/scanmail, upas/testscan – spam filters
 upas/send – mail routing and delivery
 upas/smtp, upas/smtpd – mail transport

Network system services 
 ip/dhcpd, ip/dhcpleases, ip/rarpd, ip/tftpd – Internet booting
 aux/listen – listen for calls on a network device
 ndb/query, ndb/mkhash, ndb/mkdb, ndb/cs, ndb/csquery, ndb/dns, ndb/dnsquery, ndb/ipquery, ndb/dnsdebug, ndb/mkhosts – network database
 upas/pop3, ip/imap4d – mail servers
 aux/timesync – NTP client

Network utilities 
 aan – always available network
 ip/ipconfig, ip/rip – Internet configuration and routing
 ip/telnetd, ip/rlogind, ip/rexexec, ip/ftpd – Internet remote access daemons
 ip/ping, ip/gping, ip/traceroute, ip/hogports – probe the Internet
 snoopy – spy on network packets
 ip/udpecho – echo UDP packets

Security 
 auth/aescbc, ipso, auth/secstore – secstore commands
 auth/changeuser, auth/wrkey, auth/convkeys, auth/convkeys2, auth/printnetkey, auth/status, auth/authsrv, auth/guard.srv, auth/login, auth/disable, auth/enable – maintain authentication databases
 auth/factotum, auth/fgui – authentication agent
 auth/secstored, auth/secuser – secstore commands
 delkey – delete keys from factotum

Programming tools

Compilers and programming tools 
 0a, 1a, 2a, 5a, 7a, 8a, ka, qa, va – assemblers
 0c, 1c, 2c, 5c, 7c, 8c, kc, qc, vc – C compilers
 0l, 1l, 2l, 5l, 7l, 8l, kl, ql, vl – loaders
 acid, truss, trump – debugger
 bc – arbitrary–precision arithmetic language
 cb – C program beautifier
 cpp – C language preprocessor
 ktrace – interpret kernel stack dumps
 leak, kmem – help find memory leaks
 mk, membername – maintain (make) related files
 patch – simple patch creation and tracking system
 pcc – APE C compiler driver
 strip – remove symbols from binary files
 syscall – test a system call
 yacc – yet another compiler-compiler

Application software

Web browsers 
 abaco – a "lame" text-based and graphical web browser
 i – rough web browser, based on charon
 links – a text-based and graphical web browser
 mothra – a very basic web browser
netsurf - an open-source browser with html, javascript, and css support

Desktop publishing 
 deroff, delatex – remove formatting requests
 eqn – typeset mathematics
 gs – Aladdin Ghostscript (PostScript and PDF language interpreter)
 htmlroff – HTML formatting and typesetting
 lp – printer output
 ms2html, html2ms – convert between troff's ms macros and html
 page – view FAX, image, graphic PostScript PDF, and typesetter output files
 pic, tpic – troff and tex preprocessors for drawing pictures
 pr – print file
 ps2pdf, pdf2ps – convert between PostScript and PDF
 tbl – format tables for nroff or troff
 troff, nroff – text formatting and typesetting
 troff2html – convert troff output into HTML

Graphics and multimedia 
 getmap, colors – display color map
 jpg, gif, png, ppm, bmp, v210, yuv, ico, togif, toppm, topng, toico – view and convert pictures

Various utilities and games 
 astro – print astronomical information
 cal – print calendar
 calendar – print upcoming events
 clock – draws a simple analog clock
 dict – dictionary browser
 fortune – sample lines from a file
 juke, games/jukebox, games/jukefs – music jukebox
 lens – interactive screen magnifier
 map, mapdemo – draw maps on various projections
 games/playlistfs – playlist file system
 thesaurus – search online thesaurus
 scat – sky catalogue

References

Plan 9 applications
Plan 9 applications
Plan 9 applications
Plan 9 from Bell Labs